Sagda is a genus of air-breathing land snails, terrestrial pulmonate gastropod mollusks in the family Sagdidae.

Species 
Species in the genus Sagda include:
 Sagda adamsiana
 Sagda alligans
 Sagda alveare
 Sagda anodon
 Sagda bondi
 Sagda centralis
 Sagda connectens
 Sagda cookiana - synonyms: Sagda australis, Epistylia conica
 Sagda delaminata
 Sagda epistylioides
 Sagda epistylium
 Sagda epistyloides - synonym: Sagda alveolata
 Sagda foremaniana
 Sagda grandis
 Sagda jamaicensis
 Sagda jayana
 Sagda kingswoodi
 Sagda lamellifera
 Sagda maxima
 Sagda minor
 Sagda montegoensis
 Sagda occidentalis
 Sagda osculans
 Sagda pila
 Sagda spei
 Sagda spiculosa
 Sagda torrefacta
 Sagda triptycha

References

Further reading
 

Sagdidae